The 1992 United States presidential election in Tennessee took place on November 3, 1992, as part of the 1992 United States presidential election. Voters chose 11 representatives, or electors to the Electoral College, who voted for president and vice president.

Tennessee was won by Governor Bill Clinton (D-Arkansas) with 47.08% of the popular vote over incumbent President George H. W. Bush (R-Texas) with 42.43%. Businessman Ross Perot (I-Texas) finished in third, with 10.09% of the popular vote. Clinton ultimately won the national vote, defeating incumbent President Bush and Perot.

Clinton, from neighboring Arkansas, benefited from having the state's junior U.S. Senator Al Gore as his vice presidential running mate. , this is the last election in which Rutherford County, Sumner County, Wilson County, Lincoln County, Claiborne County, Hardin County, Macon County, Bledsoe County, and Pickett County voted for a Democratic presidential candidate.

Despite Clinton flipping 44 counties won by Bush four years prior, nearly half of the state's total 95, as of 2020, this would prove to be the final election in which a Democrat flipped any counties. The aforementioned nine counties would switch to Bob Dole in 1996, followed by 21 that flipped to George W. Bush in 2000. The 2000 election, when favorite son Al Gore was the Democratic Nominee, would prove to be the last even remotely competitive election in Tennessee. 19 more counties would be shed to George Bush in his 2004 re-election. In 2008, even as Barack Obama won soundly and the national popular vote swung nearly 10 points to the left, Tennessee bucked the trend and moved rightward. Obama lost 11 more counties, including Perry, which had not voted Republican since 1920, and Stewart, which had never previously voted Republican. Finally, Jackson and Houston counties (last voting Republican in 1920 and 1928, respectively) flipped to Mitt Romney in 2012 and Hardeman County flipped to Donald Trump in 2016. The trend may even continue beyond 2020, as in that election Shelby and Davidson counties remained safely Democratic but less populated Haywood County was the closest in the state, and one of only two counties won by under 10 points (the other being Hamilton).

Results

Results by county

References

Tennessee
1992
1992 Tennessee elections